A Lifetime of Temporary Relief is a box set by Duluth, Minnesota group Low, released in 2004. The set includes a two-sided DVD containing documentaries, videos and live tracks.

Track listing
Compact Disc one
"Lullaby" (Demo) – 10:06
"Cut" (Demo) – 5:41
"Heartbeat" – 4:08
"Peanut Butter Toast and American Bandstand" – 2:23
"Tired" – 5:11
"I Started a Joke" – 4:28
"The Plan" (Demo) – 2:50
"Prisoner" (Demo) – 6:10
"Prisoner" – 3:48
"Tomorrow One" – 4:28
"Turning Over" – 7:49
"Bright" – 1:45
"Walk You Out" – 4:46
"Tear Down" – 4:48
"Standby" – 5:11
"David & Jude" – 1:22
"Cheek" – 3:24

Compact Disc two
"Venus" – 3:44
"Boyfriends & Girlfriends" – 6:06
"Surf" – 2:31
"No Need" (Version 1) – 5:03
"Be There" – 8:28
"Lift" – 5:45
"Joan of Arc" – 3:21
"Long Long Long" – 3:50
"Lion/Lamb" (Demo) – 3:50
"Will the Night" (Demo) – 2:47
"Last Breath" – 4:47
"Joan of Arc" (20 Below Mix) – 3:25
"Old Man Song" – 3:48
"Try Try Try" – 0:37
"Lord, Can You Hear Me?" – 6:24
"Venus" (Time Stereo Dub Mix) – 3:51
"Those Girls (Song for Nico)" – 3:06
[silence] – 2:50
"Words" (In Misfits Style) – 2:50
"Turn" (In Misfits Style) – 1:03
"Over the Ocean (In Misfits Style)" – 1:36

Compact Disc three
"I Remember" – 3:22
"Kindly Blessed" – 2:17
"Blue-Eyed Devil" – 5:02
"Sleep At the Bottom" – 4:54
"When You Walked" – 3:55
"Back Home Again" – 5:20
"Don't Drop the Baby" – 4:02
"Surfer Girl" – 3:35
"Blowin' in the Wind" – 3:49
"Open Arms" – 4:02
"...I Love" – 2:45
"Carnival Queen" – 5:13
"Overhead" – 4:33
"Don't Carry It All" – 4:13
"Last Night I Dreamt That Somebody Loved Me" – 3:58
"Because You Stood Still" – 5:33
"Fearless" – 6:20
"Shots & Ladders 2" – 6:47

DVD
"Words" – 5:46
"Shame" – 4:08
"Over the Ocean" – 3:50
"Hope" – 11:28
"Will the Night" – 3:07
"Weight of Water" – 4:21
"Don't Understand" – 6:56
"Immune" – 3:31
"Home" – 2:25
"Dinosaur Act" – 4:07
"Canada" – 3:49
"Over the Ocean" – 5:03
"Canada" – 15:42
"Two Step" (Live at Bard College) – 6:11
"Soon" (Live at Coolidge Corner) – 7:38
"I Remember" (Live in Paris) – 5:40

CD2-18 to CD2-21 are uncredited unlisted tracks.

A one-disc promo version of the album features the following tracks:
"I Remember"
"Venus"
"No Need"
"Lullaby"
"Because You Stood Still"
"Lion/Lamb"
"Carnival Queen"
"Peanut Butter Toast and American Bandstand"
"Bright"
"Lord, Can You Hear Me?"

References

B-side compilation albums
Low (band) compilation albums
2004 compilation albums
Music video compilation albums
Rough Trade Records compilation albums
Rough Trade Records video albums